The 2006 East Asian Judo Championships was contested in seven weight classes, seven each for men and women. 

This competition was held at National Wrestling Hall in Ulan Bator, Mongolia, 2 and 3 September.

Medal overview

Men's events

Women's events

Medals table

External links
 
 Judo Union of Asia

East Asian Judo Championships
Asian Championships, East
Judo
East Asian 2006
Judo Asian Championships, East
Judo 2006 Asian Championships, East
Judo 2006 Asian Championships, East
Judo Championships, East